Xeromunda durieui is a species of small air-breathing land snail, a terrestrial pulmonate gastropod mollusk in the family Geomitridae, the hairy snails and their allies. 

This species of snail makes and uses love darts as part of its mating behavior.

Distribution

This snail is native to south Italy, North Africa and possibly to Cyprus.

References

 Bank, R. A.; Neubert, E. (2017). Checklist of the land and freshwater Gastropoda of Europe. Last update: July 16th, 2017

External links
 
 Taxonomy at: 
 Shell image at 
 Pfeiffer L. (1847-1848). Monographia Heliceorum viventium. Sistens descriptiones systematicas et criticas omnium huius familiae generum et specierum hodie cognitarum. Volumen primum. (1): 1–160

Geomitridae
Gastropods described in 1848